Wan Light are a Swedish indie-pop/electronica duo, formed in 2003, and consisting of Krister Svensson and Magnus Karnock. Their style could be described as singer/songwriter with an electronic component. They have been compared to Mercury Rev, Neil Young, The Flaming Lips and Pet Shop Boys. They are signed to Labrador Records in Sweden. Their name comes from an Orange Juice song of the same name.

Discography
 Space Canaries (2013)
 Carmaline (2005)
 That Grim Reality (2005)
 Let's Wake Up Somewhere Else (2003)
 Landmarks and Houses (2003)

External links
Official site
Labrador Records

Wan Light